Horovce is a village and municipality in Púchov District in the Trenčín Region of north-western Slovakia.

History
In historical records the village was first mentioned in 1259.

Geography
The municipality lies at an altitude of 252 metres and covers an area of 5.353 km². It has a population of about 781 people.

Genealogical resources

The records for genealogical research are available at the state archive "Statny Archiv in Bytca, Slovakia"

 Roman Catholic church records (births/marriages/deaths): 1671-1918 (parish B)

See also
 List of municipalities and towns in Slovakia

References

External links
 
 
Surnames of living people in Horovce

Villages and municipalities in Púchov District